Corozal Town is a town in Belize, capital of Corozal District. Corozal Town is located about 84 miles north of Belize City, and 9 miles from the border with Mexico.  The population of Corozal Town, according to the main results of the 2010 census, is 9,871.

Corozal was a private estate before becoming a town in the 1840s, mostly settled by Maya Mestizo refugees from the Caste War of Yucatán.  Much of the town was built over an ancient Maya city, sometimes known as Santa Rita; this may have been the original Pre-Columbian town called Chactemal, which extended from present day Corozal to Chetumal, Mexico. Corozal Town was badly damaged by Hurricane Janet in 1955 and was substantially rebuilt afterward.

History 

Corozal, the northmost town in Belize, was founded in 1848 by refugees from the Maya Indian uprising against the Spanish in neighboring Yucatán. This uprising, known as the Caste War of Yucatán (from the Spanish "castes" or race), began as a war against the Spaniards, but it eventually became a war against the Mestizos. The Mestizos, half Spanish and half Indian, had proved to be formidable allies of the Spaniards and were thus mortal enemies of the Maya Indians.

A massacre at Bacalar, Mexico — a Mestizo stronghold about thirty miles north of Corozal Town — finally led to the exodus of thousands of Mestizos from Bacalar and the surrounding area. Between 1848 and 1856 more than 10,000 refugees crossed the Rio Hondo, the river that now serves as a boundary between Belize and Mexico. These immigrants sought refuge in northern Belize and increased the population of Corozal Town to 4500. Mr. James Blake, a magistrate, let them settle on lands in the Corozal District and helped them to establish the new crop — sugar cane.

The Mestizo refugees were far from safe in Corozal Town as the Maya Indians from the Mexican base in Santa Cruz Bravo — today Carrillo Puerto — made several incursions in Corozal Town. In defense, Corozal became a garrison town and Fort Barlee was built here in 1870. Today, the brick corner supports of the fort surround the post office complex of the buildings across from the central town square.

The immigrants brought with them Maya Mestizo culture: Spanish and Yucatec Maya language, Catholicism and Maya folklore, the use of alcalde, their family structure and way of life. Soon, there emerged a local replication of the society of the Yucatán within the boundaries of a country ruled by English expatriates.

Across the bay from Corozal Town are the mounds of Cerros, the first Maya coastal trading center. Cerros is considered one of the most important late preclassic Maya sites because it represented the first experiment with kingship in the Maya world. The remains include a number of temples, plazas, ball courts, canals, and minor structures. The most interesting artifacts so far discovered are the five jade head pendants.

Within Corozal, itself can be found another Maya ruins from the fourteenth century AD. Known as Santa Rita, the pyramid site sits atop the remains of a Maya city that dominated the area for more than 2000 years, and burial sites rich in jewelry and artifacts have been unearthed there. The monument is said to be the center of ancient Chactemal, the Maya capital of the area at the time of the first Spanish attempt to conquer the Yucatec Mayas in the early 16th century. The ruins of Santa Rita is located near the town's Hospital and is surrounded by the villages of San Andres, San Antonio, and Paraiso, by walking distances. An estimated 90% of the town was destroyed by Hurricane Janet in 1955, and most of the present structures post-date that hurricane.

The town is served by Corozal Hospital.

Climate

Population and Housing
According to the 2010 Population and Housing Census the town of Corozal has a total population of 9,871; 4,740 male and 5,131 female. The total number of households is 2,672 and the average household size is 3.7.

Language 
The most spoken language in Corozal district is Spanish and English.

Image gallery

Recreation
Corozal Town will have a radio telescope at the Wernher von Braun Observatory, owned by NASA.

In June 2020, the Corozal Town Council led by Mayor Rigo Vellos received a development proposal for an eco-friendly, world-class water park. Maximum Water Park opened to the public in April 2021.

References

External links

Travel Belize – Corozal
Corozal.com
Corozal Town at Belize.com http://www.simplybelize.org/episode01.html
¿Que Pasa Corozal? - Providing news on Corozal District and the rest of Belize.

Populated places in Corozal District
Corozal North
Corozal Bay (Belize House constituency)
Mestizo communities in Belize